Gregory James Smith (born 14 July 1974 in Hamilton, New Zealand) is a New Zealand former rugby union footballer, who played as a hooker.

Career
Smith is 1.82 m tall and weighs 106 kg. He was born and raised in New Zealand but he qualified to play for Fiji because his father was born in Fiji. He was first selected for Fiji by former coach Brad Johnstone on the recommendation of Waikato's John Boe.

He toured the UK with the Fiji team in 1995 and he made his debut against Wales which Fiji lost by 21–22. He joined the Waikato Rugby Union after that and he made it into the Chiefs squad for the Super 12 competition. He played for the Chiefs for  six  years before leaving New Zealand and going to Europe to play for the Swansea club in Wales. He returned a year later to play in the NPC match against Auckland but lost in the final. A neck injury kept him out of the 2001 tour to Italy and France and then a foot injury saw him miss the 2003 Rugby World Cup qualifiers in June and July 2002 and he also missed the test against Australia and Argentina but he recovered in time for the 2003 Rugby World Cup and he was made captain of the Fiji team.

After retiring in 2005, he was made a resource coach for the Black Ferns, and was recently appointed as an assistant coach to Samoa. He has coached for nine years in Japan and held a number of provincial coaching roles including a specialist resource coach role for the Chiefs.

In December 2014, he was made the head coach for the Black ferns team through to the next Women's Rugby World Cup in 2017. Smith voluntarily stepped down as New Zealand women's head coach on 16 June 2015.

Fiji Team 
Smith also attended Waikato University from 1993–1996 and was friends with Robert Diver.
Test debut: 1995 vs Wales in Cardiff
46 caps 1 try 5 pts (70 games 1 try)

Notes

1974 births
Rugby union players from Hamilton, New Zealand
Living people
Rugby union hookers
New Zealand expatriate sportspeople in Fiji
Fiji international rugby union players
New Zealand people of Fijian descent
Chiefs (rugby union) players
New Zealand rugby union coaches
New Zealand rugby union players
New Zealand expatriate rugby union players
Expatriate rugby union players in Wales
New Zealand expatriate sportspeople in Wales
New Zealand women's national rugby union team coaches